In mathematics, a uniformly disconnected space is a metric space  for which there exists 
such that no pair of distinct points  can be connected by a -chain.
 in  such that .

Properties

Uniform disconnectedness is invariant under quasi-Möbius maps.

References

Metric geometry